The Hestøy Bridge is a cantilever bridge in the northeastern part of the municipality of Namsos in Trøndelag county, Norway. The bridge, together with Smines Bridge form a link across the Fjærangen fjord from the Fosnes area to the village of Lund.

See also
List of bridges in Norway
List of bridges in Norway by length
List of bridges
List of bridges by length

References

Road bridges in Trøndelag
Namsos